The 1993–94 Green Bay Phoenix men's basketball team represents the University of Wisconsin–Green Bay in the 1993–94 NCAA Division I men's basketball season. Their head coach was Dick Bennett. They were the champions of the Mid-Continent Basketball tournament to earn the conference's automatic bid in the 1994 NCAA Tournament, the school's second ever appearance in the tournament. As a 12 seed, the Phoenix defeated the 5 seed University of California in the first round, 61–57. Green Bay would fall to Syracuse in the second round.

Roster

Schedule

|-
!colspan=9 style="background:#006633; color:#FFFFFF;"|Mid-Continent Conference tournament

|-
!colspan=9 style="background:#006633; color:#FFFFFF;"|NCAA tournament

References 

Green Bay Phoenix men's basketball seasons
Green Bay Phoenix men's basket
Green Bay Phoenix Men's
Green Bay Phoenix men's basket
Green Bay